Hello Again! is a 2019 Taiwanese television series created and produced by Sanlih E-Television.

Plot 
In high school, 100 days before the university entrance exams, Chang Ke Ai and Yang Zi Hao made a bet: if they are admitted to the same university, she will carry his schoolbag for an entire year! Unexpectedly she had to give up her dreams of university to pay off a family debt. Ten years later, they are just across the street, but in two different worlds. Yang Zi Hao is an executive vice president of "Gorgeous Department Store," while Chang Ke Ai is a street vendor who helps her mother sell clothes at a market. When they meet again, will they remember the bet from ten years ago?

Cast

Main Cast
Amber An as Chang Ke Ai 常可艾
Bruce Hung as Yang Zi Hao 陽子浩
Sean Lee (邵翔) as Cai Xiao Gang 蔡小剛
Mao Di as Liang Zi Jie 梁子傑
Oceana Wu as Jian Zhen Yi 簡貞怡 (Jamie Chien)

Supporting Cast
Stanley Mei (梅賢治) as Li Jian 李健
Wang Pei Ying (汪沛滢) as Jiang Wen Wen 江雯雯
Calvin Lee (地球) as Dan Ni Er 丹尼爾
Jiang Yong Qi (江泳錡) as A La A辣
Liang Yan Zhen (梁妍甄) as A Mi A咪
Yin Fu (茵芙) as Zheng Yin Yin 鄭茵茵
Ariel Chiao (喬雅琳) as Li Xiao Tian 李小恬
Tiffany Pan (潘奕如) as Wu Xiang Yin 吳香吟
Wang Dao Nan (王道南) as Yang Guo Tao 陽國滔
Kelly Mi (米凱莉) as Lin Fang Jie 林芳婕
Ruby Liu (劉馨如) as Lin Fang Ru 林芳如
Mi Na (米娜) as Lin Fang Yu 林芳瑜
Hu Pei Lian (胡佩蓮) as Zhuo Ying Ying 卓瑛瑛
Lin Pei Jun (林珮君) as Jiang Li Hua 江麗花
Long Tian Xiang (龍天翔) as Hu Ye 虎爺

Soundtrack
"Chillaxing" by Amber An
"What's Wrong 怎麼了" by Eric Chou
"The Chaos After You 如果雨之後" by Eric Chou
"Nobody But Me" by Eric Chou
"Unbreakable Love 永不失聯的愛" by Eric Chou
"Say I Love You 說聲我愛你" by Xiao Pan Pan (小潘潘) & Qi Chen (齊晨)

Broadcast

Ratings
Competing programmes on rival channels airing at the same time slot were:
 SET Taiwan - 
 FTV - A Taiwanese Tale of Two Cities,  (re-run), Music of Taiwan, 
 CTV - Chinese Restaurant, 
 CTS - , CTS Golden Selection Theatre
 PTS - , The World Between Us, The Way Home

References

External links
Hello Again! TTV Official Website 
Hello Again! SETTV Official Website 
 
 

2019 Taiwanese television series debuts
2019 Taiwanese television series endings
Taiwanese romance television series
Taiwanese drama television series
Taiwan Television original programming
Sanlih E-Television original programming